Tingira Heights is a suburb of City of Lake Macquarie in New South Wales, Australia,  south-west of Newcastle's central business district on the eastern side of Lake Macquarie. It was developed in the 1960s.

History
The Awabakal are the traditional people of this area.

Prior to 1965, the suburb was called Violet Town. A ship named after the Indigenous tribe Tingira (on the NSW/QLD border) was Australia's first naval training vessel in 1912 and was decommissioned in 1941. In 1965 the H.M.A.S Tingira Old Boys Association asked to have a town named after the ship, and the name was adopted by the Violet Town Progress Association. Tingara is an alternative spelling.

References

External links
 History of Tingira Heights (Lake Macquarie City Library)

Suburbs of Lake Macquarie